Events from the year 2000 in Austria.

Incumbents
 President: Thomas Klestil 
 Chancellor: Viktor Klima (until 4 February), Wolfgang Schüssel (starting 4 February)

Governors
 Burgenland: Hans Niessl 
 Carinthia: Jörg Haider 
 Lower Austria: Erwin Pröll 
 Salzburg: Franz Schausberger 
 Styria: Waltraud Klasnic 
 Tyrol: Wendelin Weingartner
 Upper Austria: Josef Pühringer 
 Vienna: Michael Häupl 
 Vorarlberg: Herbert Sausgruber

Events
 February 5 - Jörg Haider's far right Freedom Party of Austria enters into coalition government to international condemnation. 
 October 3 - The Freedom Party becomes the second largest party following the parliamentary election. 
 November 11 - Kaprun disaster, Austria: A cable car fire in an alpine tunnel kills 155 skiers and snowboarders.

Deaths
 January 19 - Hedy Lamarr, actress (b. 1914)
 May 11 - Paula Wessely, actress (b. 1907)
 November 20 - Josef Schaupper, alpine skier who was killed in the Kaprun disaster (b. 1963)
 November 28 - Liane Haid, actress (b. 1895)

References

 
2000s in Austria
Austria